Catherine Zaccaria or Catherine Palaiologina (died 26 August 1462) was the daughter of the last Prince of Achaea, Centurione II Zaccaria. In September 1429 she was betrothed to the Byzantine Despot of the Morea Thomas Palaiologos, and married him in January 1430 at Mystras.

She remained in the Morea as Thomas' consort until the Ottoman conquest in 1460, after which she fled to the Venetian-held island of Corfu. There she died on 26 August 1462, being buried in the Monastery of Jason and Sosipatros.

By her marriage with Thomas, she had four children, the sons Andreas and Manuel and  the daughters Helena (wife of Lazar Branković of Serbia) and Zoe (wife of Ivan III of Russia).

References

15th-century births
1462 deaths
Despotate of the Morea
Palaiologos dynasty
Catherine
15th-century Byzantine people
15th-century Byzantine women